Mattias Schoberg (born 16 June 1973) is a Swedish wrestler. He competed in the men's Greco-Roman 69 kg at the 2000 Summer Olympics.

References

External links
 

1973 births
Living people
Swedish male sport wrestlers
Olympic wrestlers of Sweden
Wrestlers at the 2000 Summer Olympics
People from Falkenberg
Sportspeople from Halland County